Sangeeta Lakshmi is a 1966 Indian Telugu-language drama film, produced by P. Narasimha Rao, Amara Ramasubba Rao under the Seetaramanjaneya Pictures banner. It stars N. T. Rama Rao, Jamuna with music composed by S. Rajeswara Rao.

Plot 
Colonel Kondala Rao (S. V. Ranga Rao), retired army officer lives with his wife Jayamma (Nirmalamma) and only daughter Radha (Jamuna), a well-known musician. Venu (N. T. Rama Rao) is also a musician, once Radha & Venu participate in a competition and Venu wins. Here Radha expresses her desires of learning music from Venu and makes her father convince Venu. During that time, they fall in love. But Kondala Rao wants to make Radha's marriage with his nephew Anand (Nagabhushanam). So, Radha marries Venu against her father's wish. Angered, Kondala Rao doesn't allow his daughter into the house, equally stubborn, Radha maintains the same. After that, Venu is not able to get any source of income then Anand asks him to sing for Nalini (L. Vijaya Lakshmi) a renowned dancer, for which Radha does not agree when the clashes arise between two.

After some time, Radha & Venu are blessed with a baby girl named Lakshmi. At that point in time, they go into deep financial problems, so Venu goes abroad with Nalini. Radha has doubts about Venu's return, so, she decides to stand on her own, leaving the baby with her parents, she reaches Hyderabad. On the other side, Venu gets misunderstandings with Nalini and while returning, the ship meets with an accident and he loses his limb. Meanwhile, Radha becomes a great singer at Hyderabad. Lakshmi, in search of her mother, leaves the house and a noble person gives her shelter. Knowing it, Radha becomes emotionally disturbed. Now Venu is in search of a sweet voice. Once he listens to Lakshmi's music without knowing her identity, decides to make her a great singer and he does so. Thereafter, he learns Lakshmi as his own. In a music competition, he makes Lakshmi challenge Radha and proves her as Sangeeta Lakshmi. Finally, the entire family is reunited and the movie ends on a happy note.

Cast 
N. T. Rama Rao as Venu
Jamuna as Radha
S. V. Ranga Rao as Kondala Rao
Nagabhushanam as Anand
Ramana Reddy as Govindaiah
Raja Babu as Chikkeswara Rao
Suryakantham as Kantham
L. Vijayalakshmi as Nalini
Nirmalamma as Jayamma

Soundtrack 

Music composed by S. Rajeswara Rao. Music released by Audio Company.

References

External links 

Indian drama films
Films scored by S. Rajeswara Rao